Eliza Edwards (1779–1846) was a human computer and daughter of Mary Edwards.

Early life and education 
Edwards was born in Ludlow to Mary and John Edwards.

Career 
Eliza was a human computer who took on the job of her mother Mary Edwards, working on the Nautical Almanac. She lost her job in 1829, during the formation of the Nautical Almanac Office. She was paid by the Board of Longitude.

References 

1779 births
1846 deaths
Human computers
People from Ludlow
British women mathematicians
19th-century English mathematicians